Jeremiah Northup (1816 – April 10, 1879) was a Canadian merchant, shipowner, and politician.

Born in Falmouth, Nova Scotia, the son of John Northup and Agnes Harvey, he had ownership of at least seven ships during his lifetime. In 1867, he was elected to the Nova Scotia House of Assembly as an anti-confederate. He was appointed to the Senate of Canada in 1870 representing the senatorial division of Halifax, Nova Scotia. A Liberal, he served until his death in 1879.

External links
 
 

1816 births
1879 deaths
Canadian senators from Nova Scotia
Canadian people of British descent
Liberal Party of Canada senators
Nova Scotia Anti-Confederation Party MLAs
People from Hants County, Nova Scotia